Anthony Joseph Schuler  (September 20, 1869 – June 3, 1944) was an American prelate of the Catholic Church. A member of the Society of Jesus, he served as the first Bishop of El Paso from 1915 to 1942.

Biography

Early life and education
Schuler was born on September 20, 1869, in St. Marys, Pennsylvania. He was the eldest of four children of Joseph and Albertina (née Algaier) Schuler, who were German immigrants from Oberprechtal. In 1876, the family moved to Georgetown, Colorado, where Schuler's father worked in the gold mines of Chicago Creek.

After his father died in a mining accident in 1883, Schuler was taken under the wing of the local Catholic priest, Rev. Nicholas Chrysostom Matz, who Schuler later recalled "became a father to me in every way." With the help of Matz, he secured two part-time jobs to support his family, one as a day laborer in the mines and the other as a store clerk. Since he was unable to attend school while working, he received private instruction under Matz. Schuler followed Matz to Denver when the latter was assigned there in 1885. In Denver, he assisted Matz as a sacristan at St. Anne's Church while furthering his education.

After hearing a sermon from Rev. Arnold Damen, a prominent Jesuit missionary, Schuler decided to also become a Jesuit priest. On December 7, 1886, he was admitted to the Society of Jesus and entered St. Stanislaus Seminary in Florissant, Missouri. He professed his first vows as a Jesuit on December 8, 1888. He studied at Florissant and Saint Louis University until 1893, when he was appointed to the faculty of Sacred Heart College (now Regis University) in Denver. He remained there for five years and then went to Woodstock College in Maryland to complete his theological studies.

Priesthood
While at Woodstock, Schuler was ordained a priest on June 27, 1901, by Cardinal Sebastiano Martinelli, the Apostolic Delegate to the United States. Following his ordination, he was allowed to skip the traditional tertianship period of Jesuit formation and was named president of Sacred Heart College in Denver.

Schuler professed his final vows as a Jesuit on March 25, 1908. That same year, he was transferred from Sacred Heart College and sent to El Paso, Texas, where he served as assistant pastor at Immaculate Conception Church and chaplain to both Hotel Dieu Hospital and Holy Family Chapel. In 1911, he returned to Denver to serve as assistant pastor at Sacred Heart Church, becoming full pastor in 1912.

Bishop of El Paso
On June 17, 1915, Schuler was named the first bishop of the Diocese of El Paso by Pope Benedict XV. The diocese had been created by Pope Pius X in March 1914, comprising more than 60,000 square miles across West Texas and southern New Mexico. However, the diocese remained without a bishop for more than a year following the death of Pius X in August 1914 and the refusal of Rev. John J. Brown to accept his appointment as the diocese's bishop. Rome accepted Brown's resignation and selected Schuler instead.

Schuler received his episcopal consecration on October 28, 1915, from Archbishop John Baptist Pitaval, with Bishops Patrick A. McGovern and Henry Regis Granjon serving as co-consecrators at the Cathedral of the Immaculate Conception in Denver. The ceremony was attended by his mentor Nicholas Chrysostom Matz, who had become Bishop of Denver in 1889, and his mother Albertina, who received her son's first episcopal blessing.

Schuler formally took charge of the Diocese of El Paso on November 11, 1915, when he was installed at Immaculate Conception Church (where he had previously served as assistant pastor and which had been designated as the new diocese's pro-cathedral). At the beginning of Schuler's tenure in 1915, the diocese contained 31 priests, 22 parishes, 58 missions, nine parochial schools, and three academies to serve 64,440 Catholics. By the end of Schuler's tenure 27 years later in 1942, there was a Catholic population of 121,854, as well as 118 priests, 49 parishes, 97 missions, 12 parochial schools, and five academies.

With Immaculate Conception Church too small to accommodate Schuler and the growing congregation, the cornerstone of a new cathedral was laid on November 12, 1916, and the Cathedral of St. Patrick was officially dedicated on Thanksgiving, November 29, 1917. During the Mexican Revolution, Schuler provided refuge for the many Catholic clergy and religious orders who fled persecution in Mexico. One such seminarian was Peter of Jesus Maldonado, who was ordained a priest by Schuler in 1918, murdered in 1937, and canonized a saint by Pope John Paul II in 2000.

Described as a "liberal" by the El Paso Times, Schuler was known to be tolerant of other faiths; speakers at the 1936 celebration of his 50 years as a Jesuit included the Episcopal bishop Frederick Bingham Howden and the Jewish rabbi Martin Zielonka. He disagreed with prohibition of alcohol, calling the Eighteenth Amendment a "failure" and "one of the greatest curses ever placed on this country." He also declared there was "no harm" in betting on horse racing, saying, "It is not a sin in itself, the sin lying in the abuse of it."

Retirement and death
In December 1941, the 72-year-old Schuler received Bishop Sidney Matthew Metzger, previously an auxiliary bishop of the Archdiocese of Santa Fe, as a coadjutor bishop with the right of succession. With a successor in place, Schuler announced his resignation as Bishop of El Paso in a letter made public on November 22, 1942. He was given the honorary title of titular bishop of Aradus on the following November 29 by Pope Pius XII.

Schuler spent his retirement at Regis University in Denver, where he died on June 3, 1944, at age 74. He was originally buried at Concordia Cemetery in El Paso, but his remains were later moved to Mount Carmel Cemetery of the same city in 1983.

References

Sources
 
 

1869 births
1944 deaths
People from St. Marys, Pennsylvania
19th-century American Jesuits
Jesuit bishops
20th-century Roman Catholic bishops in the United States
Roman Catholic bishops of El Paso
Catholics from Pennsylvania